Buwal, also known as Ma Buwal, Bual, or Gadala, is an Afro-Asiatic language spoken in Cameroon in Far North Province in and around Gadala.

Phonology

The labiodental flap  is marginal, only occurring in two native Buwal words. The labial-velar plosives are also marginal; in particular,  only occurs in one word, the ideophone .

Buwal has the vowels , which can occur in high, middle, or low tone. The schwa can be analyzed as a solely epenthetic vowel. These vowels occur as rounded allophones when adjacent to a labialized consonant, and as front vowels when the word is palatalized.

As a result, all of the vowels within a single word are either front or back, producing vowel harmony. This process does not affect loanwords, e.g. 'oil' (from Fulfulde ) or  'school' (from French ). Some loanwords have been modified to accommodate Buwal phonology, e.g. 'tea', from Fulfulde .

Notes 

Biu-Mandara languages
Languages of Cameroon
Vertical vowel systems